Viraf Patel (born Viraf Phiroz Patel on 12 June 1980) is an Indian actor, model and screenwriter. He was a sailor in the merchant navy between 1999 and 2004 and was titled as The Grasim Mr. India 2005. He is best known for his role in the Yashraj Teleseries, Mahi Way as Shiv, Adityaraj Merchant in another Yashraj production-Kismat, as Shreshth in Teri Meri Love Stories opposite Shilpa Anand and most recently as Mrityunjay in BBC's production for Life OK "Ek Boond Ishq". The 2010 Limca Softdrink Campaign established Viraf as a formidable actor/face on the Indian advertising and celluloid space. He made his debut in Theatre with Vikram Kapadia's "Bombay Talkies" in 2012.

Personal life
Viraf was born and brought up in a Parsi Zoroastrian family in Pune, Maharashtra, India. Following encouragement from his brothers, he participated in Grasim Mister India Contest by Aditya Birla Group in 2005 and won the title of Grasim Mr India. He has two elder brothers.
Viraf got engaged to Saloni Khanna on 20 February 2021 and tied the knot on 6 May 2021.

Career
Viraf completed 5 years of sailing in the merchant navy, then won the personality pageant ’Grasim Mr. India 2005‘  and has been in front of the camera since. Campaigns, ramp shows & music videos, TV commercials (most notably the Limca 2010 one) & TV anchoring came post that.

Viraf has also been the face of the country's then largest garment retail brand Pantaloon between 2005 ~09. On the ramp, he has walked for the most sought after designers on the most watched platforms like India Fashion week, Lakme Fashion week et al., right until he started work on his TV debut.

He started his acting career in one of India's most successful television mini series, Mahi Way produced by Yashraj in 2010.

He followed it up with another show with the Yashraj banner, called Kismat, as the lead character of, Aditya Raj Merchant in 2011.

Viraf portrayed the role of a business man 'Shreshth' in the BBC telefilm 'Tere Meri Love Stories' opposite Shilpa Anand.

He played the role of Mrityunjay Singh Shekhawat in the life ok drama Ek Boondh Ishq, a BBC worldwide production and his first daily soap. The show ended in October 2014.

In 2015 Viraf started work on Mahesh Bhatt's Naamkarann, for the leading Hindi entertainment TV channel Star Plus, which eventually went on air went on air in Sept 2016.

Viraf was also seen playing a hot boss in the MTV series called BigF in April 2017.

He is also reported to be working on a documentary  he is producing and directing himself since 2013, based on daughters of sex workers.

Viraf is working on few scripts and is learning screenwriting from Boman Irani at Spiral Bound

He made his debut  on the digital space with 13 Mussoorie on Viu.

Television

Filmography

Advertisements

References

External links 

 
 
 
 
 

Living people
Indian male television actors
Indian male film actors
1980 births
Indian male soap opera actors
21st-century Indian male actors
Parsi people